Moon Embracing the Sun (also known as The Moon that Embraces the Sun or The Sun and the Moon) is a 2012 South Korean television drama series, starring Kim Soo-hyun, Han Ga-in, Jung Il-woo, and Kim Min-seo. It aired on MBC from January 4 to March 15, 2012, on Wednesdays and Thursdays at 21:55 for 20 episodes.

The historical-fantasy drama is adapted from the novel of the same name written by Jung Eun-gwol. It tells of a poignant love story between a fictional king of the Joseon Dynasty and a female shaman and the conflicts and conspiracy of vying political powers.

The series reached a peak rating of 42.2%. It won the Best Drama and Best Actor awards in the television category at the 48th Baeksang Arts Awards, and multiple awards at 2012 MBC Drama Awards, including Drama of the Year.

Synopsis
The Queen Dowager orders the assassination of her stepson in order to protect her own son's throne. A-ri, a shaman of the Royal Star Mansion (Royal Astrology House), witnesses the murder. The pregnant wife of the palace's Chief Scholar helps her escape, and she vows to protect the unborn child, who has a "noble fate."

A-ri is arrested, tortured, and imprisoned. She tells her friend and fellow shaman, Jang Nok-yeong, to look after the unborn child in her stead. A-ri is declared guilty of treason and killed.

Years later, Heo Yeon-woo, the child A-ri swore to protect, and Crown Prince Lee Hwon fall in love. Prince Yangmyung, the Crown Prince's older half-brother, has also fallen in love with Yeon-woo, who does not reciprocate his feelings.

The Queen Dowager seeks to make Yoon Bo-kyung, the daughter of the Prime Minister and her blood relative, the Crown Princess in order to maintain her clan's power. However, the King is impressed by Yeon-Woo's intelligence and chooses her to be Lee Hwon's wife, infuriating Prime Minister Yoon and the Queen Dowager, who secretly orders Nok-yeong to cast a deadly curse on the new Princess.

Yeon-woo is diagnosed with an unidentifiable illness, expelled from the palace, and loses her title. She "dies" from this illness and is buried, but Nok-yeong digs her out of the grave, because the spell is temporary and only mimics the appearance of death. However, Yeon-woo is so traumatized by being buried alive that she has lost all of her memories. She and Nok-yeong leave the capital.

Crown Prince Lee Hwon unwillingly marries Bo-kyung, but refuses to consummate the marriage by citing an unnamed illness and continues to brood over his "dead" first love.

Eight years later, Lee Hwon is now king and Yeon-woo became Shaman Wol (which means "moon"). Unaware of Wol's true identity, the Grand Royal Queen Dowager calls her to the palace so that she can cure her grandson's "illness." The King is struck by Wol's unmistakeable resemblance to Yeon-woo, and he quietly launches an investigation into Yeon-woo's death.

Meanwhile, Wol struggles to understand the strange memories of her life as Yeon-woo, which she interprets as shamanic visions. She must fight Queen Yoon, the Grand Royal Queen Dowager and Prime Minister Yoon in order to reclaim her rightful place as the Queen of Joseon. Political intrigue continues to build and comes shockingly to a head as Lee Hwon fights for his throne and the woman he loves.

Cast

Main
Kim Soo-hyun as Lee Hwon, King of Joseon
Yeo Jin-goo as 15-year-old Lee Hwon, Crown Prince of Joseon
'Sun Reaching for the Moon': Lee Hwon is the intelligent and kind boy who falls in love with Heo Yeon-woo and even after her sudden death, he remains devoted to her memory. When he meets Wol, he has doubts about Yeon-woo's death and begins an investigation, unearthing political machinations and dark secrets.
Han Ga-in as Lady Heo Yeon-woo / Shaman Wol 
Kim Yoo-jung as 13-year-old Lady Heo Yeon-woo
'Moon Embracing the Sun':  Although she is destined to be the Queen of Joseon, Yeon-woo is cheated out of her fate by the scheming Queen Dowager and Prime Minister Yoon. She is appointed Crown Princess, but she mysteriously dies before the wedding. In reality, she loses her memory and becomes a shaman. Eight years later, she returns to the palace as Shaman Wol and is struck by her inexplicable attraction to the king and her strange "visions" about the king's mysterious first love.
Jung Il-woo as Prince Yangmyung 
Lee Tae-ri as young Prince Yangmyung
'Overshadowed by the Sun': Yangmyung is Lee Hwon's half-brother. Although he is the elder brother, he is the son of the king's concubine and therefore ineligible for the throne. He struggles to reconcile his lifelong, unrequited love for Yeon-woo, his love for his brother, and his attraction to Shaman Wol.
Kim Min-seo as Lady Yoon Bo-kyung / Queen Yoon 
Kim So-hyun as young Lady Yoon Bo-kyung
'A Mirror longing to be the Moon' Bo-kyung is used by the Queen Dowager and her father, Prime Minister Yoon, in order to maintain their clan's power. After Yeon-woo's death, she becomes Lee Hwon's Crown Princess. She remains in love with Lee Hwon all her life, but he still loves Yeon-woo.

Supporting

Heo clan
Sunwoo Jae-duk as Lord Heo Young-jae
Yeon-woo and Yeom's father. He is King Seongjo's trusted advisor and an enemy to Prime Minister Yoon.
Yang Mi-kyung as Madam Shin Jung-kyung
Yeon-woo and Yeom's mother. She grieves over her daughter and husband's deaths.
Song Jae-hee as Lord Heo Yeom 
Im Si-wan as 17-year-old Young Master Heo Yeom
Yeon-woo's older brother and Hwon's tutor. After Yeon-woo's death, his family falls from grace and he marries Princess Minhwa.
Yoon Seung-ah as Seol 
Seo Ji-hee as young Seol
 Yeon-woo's personal servant. She protects Yeon-woo during her time as Shaman Wol.

Royal household
Kim Young-ae as the Grand Royal Queen Dowager
 The mother of King Seongjo and grandmother of Lee Hwon. She kills Prince Uiseong in order to ensure that her son will become king and attempts to kill Yeon-woo in order to appoint her own relative to be Lee Hwon's wife and future queen. She and Prime Minister Yoon work together to protect their family's interests.
Ahn Nae-sang as King Seongjo
 Father of Lee Hwon, Prince Yangmyung and Princess Minhwa. He is haunted by his beloved half-brother's death and the knowledge that his own mother killed him. In order to prevent such conflict between his own sons, he hides his love for Yangmyung.
Kim Sun-kyung as Queen Sohye, later the Queen Dowager
Mother of Lee Hwon.
Kim Ye-ryeong as Royal Noble Consort Hui of the Miryang Park clan
Mother of Yangmyung. King Seongjo's concubine. She has no political ambition and retires to a Buddhist monastery.
Nam Bo-ra as Princess Minhwa
Jin Ji-hee as young Princess Minhwa
Lee Hwon's younger sister. She falls in love with Yeom and is determined to marry him at all costs.
Song Jae-rim as Lord Kim Jae-woon
Lee Won-keun as 15-year-old Young Master Kim Jae-woon
 An officer in the Royal Guard, he is the King's bodyguard. His loyalty to Lee Hwon strains his friendship with Yangmyung.
Jung Eun-pyo as Hyung-sun 
 Chief Eunuch Hyung-sun is Lee Hwon's trusted confidante and friend.
Kim Min-kyung as Court Lady Min 
Coming from Yeom's family in Bukcheon, she serves as lady-in-waiting to Princess Minhwa.
Chu Gwi-jung as Court Lady Jo 
Queen Yoon's lady-in-waiting since entering the palace as Crown Princess.

Royal Star Mansion (Seungsucheong)
Jeon Mi-seon as Jang Nok-young 
 Nok-young is the head shaman. She is forced to obey the Queen Dowager's order to curse Yeon-woo, but she secretly saves her and raises her as Shaman Wol.
Kim Ik-tae as Hye Gak 
 A Taoist priest who helped Nok-young escape with Yeon-woo.
Bae Noo-ri as Jan-shil
Jo Min-ah as young Jan-shil
 A shaman with powerful visions who ultimately succeeds Nok-young as the head shaman.
Jang Young-nam as A-ri
 A shaman who vows to help Yeon-woo from beyond the grave.

Yoon clan and officials
Kim Eung-soo as Lord Yoon Dae-hyung
 Prime Minister Yoon is Bo-kyung's father and the leader of the Yoon clan. He is a greedy politician who seeks to expand his family's wealth and power.
Jang Hee-soo as Madam Kim
 Wife of Prime Minister Yoon and Bo-kyung's mother.
Seo Hyun-chul as Lord Shim San
Deputy Minister of Personnel, who was named Chief Royal Secretary.
Lee Seung-hyung as Lord Han Jae-gil
Mayor, later became Minister of Defense.
Kim Seung-wook as Lord Yoon Soo-chan
Minister of Taxation, promoted to Minister of Personnel.
Yoon Hee-seok as Lord Hong Gyu-tae
 Favored by the King, he is a former president of the student body at Sungkyunkwan, who  became a secret investigator for the Uigeumbu (Court of Justice).

Production
Based on the novel by Jung Eun-gwol, the screenplay was written by Jin Soo-wan (writer of Capital Scandal) and directed by Kim Do-hoon (who previously directed Royal Family) and Lee Seong-jun (who previously directed Gyebaek).

This production marked Han Ga-in's first historical drama and return to television since Bad Guy in 2010. It is also Jung Il-woo's second historical drama following The Return of Iljimae in 2009.

Filming began in November 2011, with child actors for the first six episodes, followed by the script reading session with their adult counterparts on December 25, at MBC Dream Center in Ilsan.

In February 2012, there were talks of an extension of four episodes to the 20-episode drama. The production company, Pan Entertainment, later confirmed that there would be no extension and the series was to end on its original date of March 8, 2012. However it did not end till March 15, 2012, because director Kim Do-hoon joined the MBC strike leading to the last two episodes being delayed for a week, and replaced with two special episodes.

Filming locations
Most of the royal palace scenes were filmed on location at MBC Dramia located at Cheoin-gu, Yongin-si in Gyeonggi Province, where other historical dramas such as Dong Yi, Jumong and Queen Seondeok were also filmed. The House of Choi Cham-pan was used as Yeon-woo's childhood home and the Korean Folk Village was used for local markets, private residences of commoners and night scenes.

International broadcast
In March 2012, the drama's broadcast rights were sold to eight Asian countries, including Japan, Thailand, Hong Kong, Singapore, Taiwan, Malaysia, Sri Lanka, Indonesia and the Philippines. At that time it set the record as the most profitable drama for MBC, which was later surpassed by Arang and the Magistrate in August 2012. It was made available on Netflix in 2015 in the US, later also in other territories.

Original soundtrack

Part 1

Part 2

Part 3

Part 4

Part 5

Part 6

Ratings

It aired on GMA Network from August 13 to November 2, 2012, on weeknights at 5:45 PM PST. Each episode runs 45 minutes including commercial breaks. The entire series was dubbed in Filipino.

Awards and nominations

Musical theatre
A stage musical adaptation was performed at the Seoul Arts Center from July 6 to 31, 2013, with succeeding runs in 2014. Kim Da-hyun, Jeon Dong-seok and Cho Kyu-hyun alternated as Lee Hwon, and Jeon Mi-do, Ahn Shi-ha, Lina, Jung Jae-eun and Seohyun alternated as Yeon-woo.

Notes

References

External links
 
Moon Embracing the Sun at MBC Global Media

2012 South Korean television series debuts
2012 South Korean television series endings
Korean-language television shows
MBC TV television dramas
Shamanism in popular culture
Fiction about amnesia
South Korean fantasy television series
South Korean historical television series
Television shows based on South Korean novels
Television series by Pan Entertainment
Television series set in the Joseon dynasty